Sasa (also spelled Saasaa) is a town in southern Syria, administratively part of the Rif Dimashq Governorate, located southwest of Damascus near the Golan Heights (Quneitra Governorate). Nearby localities include Kafr Hawr to the north, Kanaker to the east, Khan Arnabah to the southwest, and Deir Maker to the south. According to the Syria Central Bureau of Statistics, Sa'sa' had a population of 9,945 in the 2004 census. The town is also the administrative centre of—though not the largest town in—the Sa'sa' nahiyah, which is made up of 17 towns having a combined population of 45,233.

References

Populated places in Qatana District
Towns in Syria